Big Boy is the nickname of:

 Arthur Crudup (1905–1976), American singer and guitarist
 Big Boy Goudie (1899–1966), American jazz musician
 Alberto Reynoso (1940-2011), Filipino basketball player
 Malcolm Sebastian (1923–2006), American comedian
 Arthur "Big Boy" Spires (1912–1990), American blues singer and guitarist
 Carlisle Towery (1920–2012), National Basketball Association and League player
 Guinn "Big Boy" Williams (1899–1962), American actor
 Big Boy (radio host), American DJ, radio host and actor

See also 
 
 

Lists of people by nickname